Zordaar is a 1996 Indian Hindi-language film directed by Ajay Kashyap. It stars Govinda, Aditya Pancholi, Mandakini, Neelam in pivotal roles. The film was shot and completed in 1988 but was delayed and released 8 years later. This film had marked actress Mandakini's final film prior to her choice of retirement (to concentrate on her family further).

Cast
 Govinda as Ravi
 Aditya Pancholi as Shiva / Tony
 Mandakini as Neha
 Neelam as Anju Sharma
 Gulshan Grover as	Devil
 Kiran Kumar as Fox
 Aloknath as Sanga
 Shafi Inamdar as ACP Sharma 
 Bob Christo as John

Soundtrack
Available on T-Series on LP, CD, Cassette and Digital Download.

External links

1990s Hindi-language films
1996 films
Films scored by Anu Malik